Religion in politics covers various topics related to the effects of religion on politics. Religion has been claimed to be "the source of some of the most remarkable political mobilizations of our times".

Religious political doctrines 

Various political doctrines have been directly influenced or inspired by religions. Various strands of Political Islam exist, with most of them falling under the umbrella term of Islamism. Graham Fuller has argued for a broader notion of Islamism as a form of identity politics, involving "support for [Muslim] identity, authenticity, broader regionalism, revivalism, [and] revitalization of the community." This frequently may take a socially conservative or reactionary form, as in wahhabism and salafism. Ideologies which espouse Islamic modernism include Islamic socialism and Post-Islamism.

Christian political movements range from Christian socialism, Christian communism, and Christian anarchism on the left, to Christian democracy on the centre, to the Christian right.

Beyond universalist ideologies, religions have also been involved in nationalist politics. Hindu nationalism exists in the Hindutva movement. Religious Zionism seeks to create a religious Jewish state. The Khalistan movement aims to create a homeland for Sikhs.

An extreme form of religious political action is religious terrorism. Islamic terrorism has been evident in the actions of the Islamic State, Boko Haram, the Taliban and Al-Qaeda, all of these organizations practice jihadism. Christian terrorism has been connected to anti-abortion violence and white supremacy, for example in the Christian Identity movement. Saffron terror describes terrorism connected to Hinduism. There has also been cases of Jewish religious terrorism, such as the Cave of the Patriarchs massacre, as well as of Sikh terrorism, such as the bombing of Air India Flight 182.

Religious political issues 

Religious political issues may involve, but are not limited to, those concerning freedom of religion, applications of religious law, and the right to religious education.

Religion and the state 

States have adopted various attitudes towards religions, ranging from theocracy to state atheism.

A theocracy is "government by divine guidance or by officials who are regarded as divinely guided".
Modern day recognised theocracies include the Islamic Republic of Iran and the Holy See, while the Taliban and Islamic State are insurgencies attempting to create such polities. Historical examples include the Islamic Caliphates and the Papal States.

A more modest form of religious state activity is having an official state religion. Unlike a theocracy, this maintains the superiority of the state over the religious authorities. Over 20% (a total of 43) of the countries in the world have a state religion, most of them (27) being Muslim countries.  There are also 13 officially Buddhist countries such as Bhutan, while state churches are present in 27 countries.

In contrast to religious states, secular states recognise no religion. This is often called the principle of the separation of church and state. A more extreme version, Laïcité, is practiced in France, which prohibits all religious expressions in many public contexts.

Some states are explicitly atheistic, usually those which were produced by revolution, such as various socialist states or the French First Republic.

There have also been cases of states creating their own religions, such as imperial cults or the Cult of Reason.

Religion and political behaviour

Frameworks on religion and political identity
Understanding religion’s impact on political behaviour is essential because of its complex relationship to the individual: for a political subject, faith is at once an ideology and an  identity. As a result, political scientists are divided on whether to consider it alongside other ethnic cleavages such as race, language, caste, and tribe, or whether to recognise it as a separate, special kind of political influence. 

Daniel N. Posner holds the former perspective: that religion should be conflated with identity. He underlines that identity is important in politics not because of some “passions [or] traditions it embodies”, but because it reflects “the expected behaviour of other political factors”. In such a  framework, religion is treated as a fungible label that can be ‘activated’ and constitute a criteria for membership in an ethnic group. 

The latter perspective has been argued by relatively recent scholars, advocating for “(More) Serious” attention to religion in Comparative Politics. Grzymala-Busse outlines three often overlooked characteristics of religion which differentiate it from other markers of  identity:

 Its power to transcend national boundaries. Religion ss arguably the largest unit to which individuals claim loyalty (Islam claims roughly 1.5 billion adherents, Christianity roughly 2 billion – respectively 22% and 33% of the world’s population).  
 Its demanding commitment by followers to a specific lifestyle, affecting dress codes,  diets, political views – religion proposes an alternative lifestyle defined by  “supernatural” forces.
 Its strength of resistance to secular onslaught because of abnormally “high stakes” like eternal salvation or damnation, making religion much less “pliable” than other ethnic identities. 

Considering these characteristics, it becomes possible to consider religion as a unique identity  variable with immense power. Several analyses even regard religion as a  variable so potent that it is able to reinforce other identities, and as a result allows religious components in secular spheres of society (see: Iversen and Rosenbluth, 2006; Trejo, 2009; Grossman, 2015).

Debates about religion in politics 

There have been arguments for and against a role for religion in politics. Yasmin Alibhai-Brown has argued that "faith and state should be kept separate" as "the most sinister and oppressive states in the world are those that use God to control the minds and actions of their populations", such as Iran and Saudi Arabia. To this, Dawn Foster has responded that when religion is fully unmoored from politics it becomes all the more insular and more open to abuse".

See also 

 Christianity and politics
 Judaism and politics
 Political aspects of Islam
 
 Religion and politics in the United States

References 

Politics

Religious studies